The C.H. Fitch House is a historic house at 15 Oread Street in Worcester, Massachusetts.  The -story brick building was built c. 1878 for Charles H. Fitch, owner of boot manufacturing businesses.  Its styling has both Italianate and Gothic Revival elements, including deep eaves with brackets (an instance of the former), and stone banding in the walls along with a porch decorated with jigsaw scrolling that are typical of the latter.

The house was listed on the National Register of Historic Places in 1980.

See also
National Register of Historic Places listings in southwestern Worcester, Massachusetts
National Register of Historic Places listings in Worcester County, Massachusetts

References

Houses completed in 1878
Houses in Worcester, Massachusetts
National Register of Historic Places in Worcester, Massachusetts
Houses on the National Register of Historic Places in Worcester County, Massachusetts